2,4-Dichlorobenzyl alcohol is a mild antiseptic, able to kill bacteria and viruses associated with mouth and throat infections.  It is a common ingredient in throat lozenges such as Cofsils, Strepsils, Lorsept, and Gorpils. It is also an ingredient in the European product Neo Borocillina. A low-pH throat lozenge containing dichlorobenzyl alcohol (1.2 mg) and amylmetacresol (0.6 mg) has been found to deactivate respiratory syncytial virus and SARS-Cov, but not adenovirus or rhinovirus. A dentifrice containing 10% sodium benzoate and 0.3% dichlorobenzyl alcohol maintains antimicrobial activity for 5 to 10 minutes after brushing.

References

Primary alcohols
Chlorobenzenes